Genesee County Sheriff's Office may refer to:
Genesee County Sheriff's Office (Michigan)
Genesee County Sheriff's Office (New York)